Darlington is a former village in Restigouche County, New Brunswick, Canada. it is now a part of the Town of Dalhousie. Darlington also contains the town's only shopping center the Dalington Mall.

History
It was incorporated as a Village in 1977 then merged into the Town of Dalhousie November 4, 1982. The main street (Route 275) through the former village was renamed Darlington Drive after amalgamation. It became residential in the post war housing period in the late 1940s and 50s, when farmland was subdivided.  The first mayor of Darlington, was Richard W. Taylor who won by a landslide.  He won a second term by acclamation, but died shortly after this.  It was after this that it was amalgamated with Dalhousie.

See also
List of Neighbourhoods in New Brunswick

References

Neighbourhoods in New Brunswick
Populated places disestablished in 1982
Former municipalities in New Brunswick